Xmas tree can be:

A colloquial abbreviation for a Christmas tree.
It is also the proper name for such an object in the 31st century world of Futurama.
The more common spelling for the  oilfield Christmas tree.
The name given to the set of lights used for starting a drag race.